James Stamp (1904–1985) was an American professional musician.

Background
Stamp was a professional musician from the age of 16, starting in the Mayo Clinic Band at Rochester, Minnesota. After having played in different Minneapolis theatres he was asked to play 4th trumpet in the Minneapolis Symphony Orchestra.  Playing 4th trumpet didn't allow for enough performances and the first trumpet player treated him like a valet.  Later, after an argument with the 1st trumpet he was asked to play the 1st part on the Brahms 2nd Symphony while on tour to Cincinnati.  He was then given a contract as 1st trumpet for the next season immediately after the concert.  James Stamp held a position with the Minneapolis Symphony Orchestra for 17 years playing Trumpet under conductors such as Henri Verbrugghen, Eugene Ormandy and his favorite Dimitri Mitropoulos.

Later after Eugene Ormandy left the Orchestra and  Dimitri Mitropoulos became conductor the orchestra's finances were not very good. So, in 1944 he decided to sell his house and move to California. Mitropoulos tried to talk him out of leaving, but the house was already sold and he had made his decision.  Stamp relocated to California, where he was immediately asked to play in studio orchestras in Hollywood, as well as radio and television programs. He suffered a heart attack in 1954, after which he devoted more time to teaching. He wrote an instructional book, Warm-ups + Studies which was first published in 1978. He died on December 22, 1985.

Thomas Stevens, former Principal Trumpeter of the Los Angeles Philharmonic Orchestra said, "I believe James Stamp was one of the finest teachers in the world. His approach was so flexible that I have never seen him fail to improve a player, whether it be an established symphony musician, jazz or lead player or a twelve-year-old student."

Bibliography
 Warm-ups + Studies: trumpet & other brass instruments in treble clef, CD in C and Bflat (1995)

Articles
Articles in the Brass Bulletin, International Magazine for Brass Players:
 Brass Bulletin 39, III-1982 (p. 14-21), Alfred Willener, Subtle Teaching
 Brass Bulletin 53, I-1986 (p. 3-4), Jean-Pierre Mathez/Thomas Stevens, Editorial "Homage to James Stamp"
 Brass Bulletin 100, IV-1997 (p. 59-65), Jean-Christophe Wiener, James Stamp, Master in Listening part 1

References

External links
 James Stamp, Warm-ups and Studies for trumpet at Editions Bim
 James Stamp: Practical Hints

American trumpeters
American male trumpeters
1985 deaths
1904 births
20th-century American musicians
20th-century trumpeters
20th-century American male musicians